Tha Thong is a sub-district in the Mueang Phitsanulok District of Phitsanulok Province, Thailand.

Geography
Tha Thong is bordered to the north-east by Wat Chan, to the east by Bueng Phra, to the south by Tha Pho and to the west by Bang Rakam of Bang Rakam District. Tha Thong lies in the Nan Basin, which is part of the Chao Phraya Watershed.

Administration
The following is a list of the sub-district's mubans, which roughly correspond to the villages:

History
Ban Wat Chula Manee was historically a thriving commercial Nan River port used to transport crops to Bangkok in exchange for currency and gold.
King Boromma Trailokanat (1448–1488), accompanied by more than 2,000 followers, was ordained as a monk at Wat Chula Manee in 1461.

Economy
The present economy of Tha Thong is based on rice and vegetable farming.

Temples
Wat Chula Manee in Ban Wat Chula Manee
Wat Sri Rat Naram in Ban Jung Nang
Wat Suang Aram in Ban Rai
Wat Nong Hua Yang in Ban Nong Hua Yang

Governmental institutions
Bureau of Irrigation in Ban Tha Thong
Phitsanulok Province Co-operative

Education
Phitsanulok Pityakhom School

Attractions
 Wat Chulamani is known for its corncob-shaped tower or prang and its unique, ornate and elaborate plaster designs. It is also the oldest standing temple in Phitsanulok Province.
 Wat Jung Nang fish raft

Notes

References

Tambon of Phitsanulok province
Populated places in Phitsanulok province